Yves de Daruvar (31 March 1921 – 28 May 2018) was a French military officer and politician who was the Secretary-general of French Somaliland from 1959 to 1962, and the High Commissioner of Comoros from 1962 to 1963.

References

1921 births
2018 deaths
French military officers
French politicians
French expatriates in Djibouti